Forconi may refer to:

 Riccardo Forconi (born 1970), Italian cyclist
 The Forconi Cup (organised 1942-1962), Algerian football competition named after Edmond Forconi
 Forconi (Movimento dei), name of the 2013 Italian social protests